Government Medical College and Super Facility Hospital, Azamgarh is a state-run medical college located in Chakrapanpur of Azamgarh, Uttar Pradesh.

The college has guidance and mentorship of Baba Raghav Das Medical College, Gorakhpur.

History
It was established in 2008. In 2013, the institute was recognized for 100 M.B.B.S. seats by Medical Council of India.

In 2006, OPDs were started which gradually shifted to 140 Bedded IPD & Presently GMC & SFH is running with 550 Beds IPDs, well created emergency & Private wards. The Hospital has well trained Health Care workers including Clinicians, Nursing Staff & Paramedical Staff. The Academic activities started in August 2013 with first Batch of MBBS students.

Courses
Each year 100 students are allowed to take admission in the M.B.B.S. course by the competitive examination NEET.

Campus
The Government Medical College & Super Facility Hospital is situated at Chakrapanpur of the historic city of Azamgarh in U.P. Chakrapanpur is about 20 km away from Azamgarh city. GMC & SFH is spread in 105 acre area which includes Administrative Block, Academic Block, Central Library, Examination hall, Auditorium, Lecture Theater & Various Departments of Medical Education. It also consists of different Residents as faculty and staff flats, S.R. Hostel, J.R. Hostel, Boys hostel, Girls hostel, Intern Girls and Boys hostel, Nursing Hostel & Guest house.

External links
 Official website

References

Medical colleges in Uttar Pradesh
Education in Azamgarh
2008 establishments in Uttar Pradesh
Colleges in Azamgarh district
Hospitals in Uttar Pradesh